The arbor vitae  (Latin for "tree of life") is the cerebellar white matter, so called for its branched, tree-like appearance. In some ways it more resembles a fern and is present in both cerebellar hemispheres.  It brings sensory and motor information to and from the cerebellum. The arbor vitae is located deep in the cerebellum. Situated within the arbor vitae are the deep cerebellar nuclei; the dentate, globose, emboliform and the fastigial nuclei. These four different structures lead to the efferent projections of the cerebellum.

Related
Godfrey Blount's 1899 book Arbor Vitae was ‘a book on the nature and development of imaginative design for the use of teachers and craftsmen’.

Additional Images

References

External links

 

Cerebellar connections